Westbrook Hay School is a culturally significant great house located in Hemel Hempstead, Hertfordshire, England, that has housed the independent Westbrook Hay Prep School since 1963.

Listed building 
Westbrook Hay was built in the 17th century and remained in the ownership of the Ryder family (Richard Ryder, then Granville Ryder and then Dudley Ryder) until the Second World War, after which it became the headquarters of the Hemel Hempstead New Town Development Corporation.

A Grade II listed building on the National Heritage List for England, Westbrook Hay School is in a rural location on 26 acres of parkland overlooking the Bourne valley, off the A41 between Berkhamsted and Hemel Hempstead in Hertfordshire.

During the 1950s, the  drive became the Westbrook Hay Hill Climb. The building began housing a school in 1963, and it was listed on the National Heritage List in 1966 as "Westbrook Hay School".

Prep school 
Westbrook Hay Prep School is a co-educational independent school for children from rising 3–13 years. Augustus Orlebar, a former housemaster at Radley College, established the school in 1892 in Bedford as a boarding school for boys. It moved to Hinwick House near Wellingborough shortly thereafter, when it was named "Hinwick House School", and then to Gadebridge House in Hemel Hempstead in 1914. The school remained there until the Commission for New Towns forced it out of those premises as part of the development of the new town in 1963. That year the school moved to Westbrook Hay and took its present name.

Alumni 
 Deji Olatunji - English entertainer
Alex Hales - English cricketer
Raef Bjayou - British entrepreneur and television presenter
Luke O'Nien - English professional footballer

References

External links 

 The Orange Walk - Woods & Meadows of Westbrook Hay

17th-century establishments in England
Bovingdon
Educational institutions established in 1892
Private schools in Hertfordshire
National Heritage List for England